Herotyda is a genus of moths belonging to the subfamily Tortricinae of the family Tortricidae. It contains only one species, Herotyda minuta, which is found on Borneo (Pulo Laut).

See also
List of Tortricidae genera

References

 , 2005: World Catalogue of Insects vol. 5 Tortricidae.

External links
tortricidae.com

Tortricini
Tortricidae genera